Helene J. Polatajko is an occupational therapy scholar, and Professor Emerita in the department of occupational science and occupational therapy at the University of Toronto's Temerty Faculty of Medicine.

Education 
Polatajko completed a Bachelor of Occupational Therapy at McGill University, and a master's and a PhD at the University of Toronto's Ontario Institute for Studies in Education (OISE).

Career 
Polatajko's research explored the role of cognition in motor-based performance, and led to the development of a daily treatment to enable children with Developmental Coordination Disorder reach occupational therapy goals (titled the Cognitive Orientation to daily Occupational Performance approach). In 2021, Polatajko was appointed as an Officer of the Order of Canada for "significantly advancing the understanding of developmental coordination disorder in children."

Polatajko is a fellow of the Canadian Academy of Health Sciences.

References 

Occupational therapists
McGill University alumni
University of Toronto alumni
Academic staff of the University of Toronto
Year of birth missing (living people)
Living people
Officers of the Order of Canada
Fellows of the Canadian Academy of Health Sciences